The 2021–22 Northwestern Wildcats men's basketball team represented Northwestern University in the 2021–22 NCAA Division I men's basketball season. They were led by ninth-year head coach Chris Collins. The Wildcats played their home games at Welsh–Ryan Arena in Evanston, Illinois as members of the Big Ten Conference. They finished the season 15–16, 7–13 in Big Ten play to finish in a three-way tie for 10th place. As the No. 12 seed in the Big Ten tournament, they defeated Nebraska in the first round before losing to Iowa in the second round.

Previous season
In a season limited due to the ongoing COVID-19 pandemic, the Wildcats finished the 2020–21 season 9–15, 6–13 to finish in 12th place in Big Ten play. They lost in the first round of the Big Ten tournament to Minnesota.

Offseason

Departures

Incoming transfers

Recruiting classes

2021 recruiting class

2022 recruiting class

Roster

Schedule and results

|-
!colspan=9 style=|Exhibition

|-
!colspan=9 style=|Regular season

|-
!colspan=9 style=|Big Ten tournament

Source

Rankings

*AP does not release post-NCAA Tournament rankings.^Coaches did not release a Week 1 poll.

References

Northwestern Wildcats
Northwestern Wildcats men's basketball seasons
Northwestern Wild